The German Red Pied (or ) is a breed of cattle from Germany.

The development of the breed occurred in several regions in Germany during the 19th century, and in 1934 Meuse-Rhine-Issel blood was introduced. The females average  in height and weigh .

References 

Cattle breeds originating in Germany
Cattle breeds
Animal breeds on the GEH Red List